Dave Chalk may refer to:
 Dave Chalk (baseball)
 Dave Chalk (entrepreneur)